XII may refer to:
 12 (number) or XII in Roman numerals
 12th century or XII in Roman numerals
 XII (album), a 2012 album by American country music singer Neal McCoy
 XII (single), a 2019 single album by K-pop singer Chungha, featuring the song "Gotta Go"
 hypoglossal nerve (XII), twelfth cranial nerve
 The Big 12 Conference, a U.S. college athletic conference whose logo consists of a stylized "XII"

See also
 12 (disambiguation)
 The Twelve (disambiguation)